Enoshima is an island in Kanagawa prefecture, Japan.

Enoshima may also refer to:

 Enoshima (train)
 Enoshima, Miyagi, an island in Miyagi prefecture, Japan
 Enoshima-class minesweeper

See also